Michael Conner Capel (born May 19, 1997) is an American professional baseball outfielder for the Oakland Athletics of Major League Baseball (MLB). He made his MLB debut in 2022 with the St. Louis Cardinals.

Amateur career
Capel attended Seven Lakes High School in Katy, Texas, and played on their baseball team. As a senior, he batted .456 with 36 runs, 27 doubles, and 23 stolen bases. He committed to play college baseball for the Texas Longhorns. He was selected by the Cleveland Indians in the fifth round of the 2016 Major League Baseball draft, and he signed with them for $361,300, forgoing his commitment to Texas.

Professional career

Cleveland Indians organization
After signing, Capel was assigned to the Rookie-level Arizona League Indians to make his professional debut. For the season, he slashed .210/.270/.290 with 13 RBIs and ten stolen bases in 35 games. In 2017, he played for the Lake County Captains of the Class A Midwest League where he batted .246 with 22 home runs, 61 RBIs, and a .795 OPS over 119 games. He began 2018 with the Lynchburg Hillcats of the Class A-Advanced Carolina League.

St. Louis Cardinals
Capel was traded to the St. Louis Cardinals on July 31, 2018, along with Jhon Torres, in exchange for Oscar Mercado. He was assigned to the Palm Beach Cardinals of the Class A-Advanced Florida State League and ended the season there. Over 118 games between Lynchburg and Palm Beach, he slashed .257/.341/.376 with seven home runs, 63 RBIs, and 15 stolen bases. Capel began the 2019 season with the Springfield Cardinals of the Class AA Texas League. In June, he played eight games with the Memphis Redbirds of the Class AAA Pacific Coast League. Over 106 games between the two teams, Capel hit .248 with 11 home runs and 47 RBIs. After the season, he played in the Arizona Fall League for the Glendale Desert Dogs.

In July 2020, Capel signed on to play for Team Texas of the Constellation Energy League, a makeshift 4-team independent league created as a result of the COVID-19 pandemic which caused the cancellation of the minor league season. He hit .200 with one home run and six RBIs over 27 games for Team Texas. For the 2021 season, Capel returned to Memphis, slashing .261/.342/.448 with 14 home runs, 51 RBIs, and 17 doubles over 114 games. He returned to Memphis to begin the 2022 season.

On June 27, 2022, the Cardinals selected Capel's contract and promoted him to the major leagues. He made his MLB debut that night in the top of the ninth inning as a defensive replacement versus the Miami Marlins. He registered his first MLB hit on June 29 with a single off of Sandy Alcántara of the Miami Marlins. Capel hit his first MLB home run on July 4 versus Jesse Chavez of the Atlanta Braves at Truist Park. On September 6, Capel was designated for assignment.

Oakland Athletics
On September 9, 2022, Capel was claimed off waivers by the Oakland Athletics and subsequently added to their 40-man roster.

Personal life
Capel's father, Mike Capel, played in Major League Baseball for the Chicago Cubs, Milwaukee Brewers, and Houston Astros. In 2019, Capel and Kacy Clemens filed a lawsuit against a bar in Houston alleging they were assaulted by a bouncer; they won and were awarded $3.24 million.

References

External links

1997 births
Living people
People from Katy, Texas
Baseball players from Texas
Major League Baseball outfielders
St. Louis Cardinals players
Oakland Athletics players
Arizona League Indians players
Lake County Captains players
Lynchburg Hillcats players
Palm Beach Cardinals players
Glendale Desert Dogs players
Springfield Cardinals players
Memphis Redbirds players